Coreopsis delphiniifolia, the larkspurleaf tickseed, is a North American species of perennial tickseeds in the family Asteraceae. It is native to the Southeastern United States, primarily Georgia and the Carolinas with a few outlying populations in Tennessee and Virginia. It is listed as an endangered species in Tennessee.

Coreopsis delphiniifolia is a perennial herb up to 90 cm (3 feet) tall with yellow flower heads.

References

External links
United States Department of Agriculture Plants Profile for Coreopsis delphiniifolia (larkspurleaf tickseed)

delphiniifolia
Flora of the Southeastern United States
Plants described in 1818
Taxa named by Jean-Baptiste Lamarck